Podu (Romanian for "the bridge") starts off the names of several places in Romania. It is also a traditional system of cultivation used by tribes in India, whereby different areas of jungle forest are cleared by burning each year to provide land for crops.

Places 
Podu Broşteni
Podu Coşnei
Podu Corbului
Podu Corbencii
Podu Cristinii
Podu Cheii
Podu Dâmboviţei
Podu Doamnei
Podu Grosului
Podu Hagiului
Podu Ilfovăţului
Podu Iloaiei
Podu Jijiei
Podu Lacului
Podu lui Galben
Podu lui Paul
Podu Lung
Podu Muncii
Podu Nărujei
Podu Oprii
Podu Oltului
Podu Popa Nae
Podu Pietriş
Podu Pitarului
Podu Rizii
Podu Stoica
Podu Şchiopului
Podu Turcului
Podu Ursului
Podu Văleni
Podu Vadului